Tubb is a surname, and may refer to:
Barry Tubb (b. 1963), American film and television actor and director
Edwin Charles Tubb (1919–2010), British science-fiction author and editor
Ernest Tubb (1914–1984), American country music singer and songwriter
Evelyn Tubb, British singer and musician
Frederick Harold Tubb (1881–1917), Australian army officer; recipient of the Victoria Cross for action in World War I
Glenn Douglas Tubb (1935–2021, American songwriter
Justin Tubb (1935–1998), American country-music singer and songwriter; son of Ernest Tubb
Richard Tubb (born 1959), American Air Force officer; physician to President George W. Bush
Shannon Tubb (born 1980), Australian cricket player
Tubb, a fictional character in Rubbadubbers